Afossochitonidae is an extinct  of polyplacophoran mollusc.

References 

Prehistoric mollusc families
Chitons